The American Legion Hall near Shoshone, Idaho is a stone building that was built in 1928 and listed on the NRHP on September 8, 1983.  It is of Bungalow/Craftsman architecture and served as a clubhouse and as a meeting hall, and was listed on the NRHP for its architecture. It is located at 107 West A Street in Shoshone.  It was built by stonemason Jack Oughton.  It was also a work of Steve Rhodes.

It has a porch that is inset at the front and wraps out around one side of the house.

References

 More information from The Idaho Heritage Trust

American Legion buildings
Clubhouses on the National Register of Historic Places in Idaho
Buildings and structures completed in 1928
Buildings and structures in Lincoln County, Idaho
National Register of Historic Places in Lincoln County, Idaho
Lava rock buildings and structures
Bungalow architecture in Idaho
American Craftsman architecture in Idaho